Yav is the seventh full-length album by the Russian pagan metal band Arkona. It was released on 25 April 2014 through Napalm Records.

The album references the material world Yav. Violin players Olli Vänskä of Turisas and Alexey of Sviatogor appear as guest musicians.

Track listing

Reception

The Sonic Seducer magazine wrote that Yav was more mature and serious than Arkona's previous releases, leaving the clichés of the genre behind. The album was also lauded for a diversity of moods. The reviewer for the Austrian Stormbringer website observed that elements of black metal had now been combined with Arkona's typical style which provided for the album's sinister atmosphere.

References

2014 albums
Arkona (band) albums
Napalm Records albums